Robert Desjardins (born March 16, 1970) is a Canadian curler from Chicoutimi, Quebec. He is a two-time Quebec provincial champion and a Canadian mixed doubles champion.

Career
Desjardins skipped a team at the 2010 Quebec provincials, but finished outside of the playoffs. The next year, Desjardins played as third for François Gagné, and finished fourth in the 2011 Quebec provincials after round robin play. They then upset the top two teams, skipped by Serge Reid and Jean-Michel Ménard, to win their first provincial championship and Brier appearance. They finished in tenth place at the Brier with a 3–8 win–loss record. Desjardins then skipped his own team in the following year's provincials, and edged an undefeated Philippe Lemay in the final in an extra end after losing to him in the page playoffs, winning his first provincial championship as skip. Representing Quebec at the 2012 Tim Hortons Brier, Desjardins and team finished in ninth place with a 4–7 win–loss record. Desjardins returned to defend his provincial title the next year, but lost in the page playoffs to Ménard and in the semifinal to Lemay.

In mixed doubles, Desjardins teamed up with Isabelle Néron to play in the inaugural Canadian Mixed Doubles Curling Trials. Finishing third in pool play, Desjardins and Néron flew through the playoffs, edging three teams, including former Canadian mixed curling champions Mark Dacey and Heather Smith-Dacey, to claim the championship. Desjardin and Néron struggled at the worlds, however, and finished in fifth place in their group with a 4–4 win–loss record.

Personal life
Desjardins works as a grade 9 math teacher with the Commission scolaire des Rives-du-Saguenay. He is in a relationship with Veronique Bouchard and has three children.

Teams

References

External links

1970 births
Curlers from Quebec
Canadian mixed doubles curling champions
French Quebecers
Living people
Sportspeople from Saguenay, Quebec
Sportspeople from Montreal
Canadian schoolteachers
Canadian male curlers